Rebecca Gargano (born 16 December 1994 in Marino, Lazio) is an Italian fencer who won one gold medal at the 2019 Summer Universiade. She also won a silver at the 2015 European Games. She won one of the bronze medals in the women's individual sabre event at the 2022 Mediterranean Games held in Oran, Algeria.

See also
 Italy at the 2019 Summer Universiade

References

External links
 Rebecca Gargano at FIG
 Aeronautica Militare

1994 births
Living people
Italian female fencers
Universiade medalists in fencing
Universiade gold medalists for Italy
Fencers at the 2015 European Games
European Games medalists in fencing
European Games silver medalists for Italy
Medalists at the 2019 Summer Universiade
Mediterranean Games bronze medalists for Italy
Mediterranean Games medalists in fencing
Competitors at the 2022 Mediterranean Games
20th-century Italian women
21st-century Italian women